Anthrols (sometimes called anthranols) are the hydroxylated derivatives of anthracene.  For the monohydroxo derivatives, three isomers are possible: 1-anthrol, 2-anthrol, and 9-anthrol.  The latter exists as a minor tautomer of 9-anthrone.  Despite their simplicity, these compounds have little commercial value.  1- and 2-substituted anthracenes typically are prepared via the hydroxy anthroquinones, which means that the preparation of these derivatives is arduous.

References

Anthracenes
Hydroxyarenes